Amaszonas Uruguay was the flag carrier airline of Uruguay. The airline operated commercial passenger services out of its hubs at Carrasco International Airport and Laguna del Sauce International Airport to most major South American destinations, as well as several secondary destinations in the Southern Cone.

History

In April 2015, the Bolivian airline Línea Aérea Amaszonas reached an agreement with the Uruguayan company BQB Lineas Aereas, thus obtaining the transfer of its permits to enter the aforementioned airline's airspace and changing its name to Amaszonas Uruguay in exchange for maintaining 30 employees of this airline. The airline announced the suspension of operations on November 19, 2020. The airline officially ceased all operations on January 21, 2021.

Destinations
Amaszonas Uruguay flew to the following destinations:

Codeshare agreements
Aerolíneas Argentinas
Air Europa
Copa Airlines
Gol Linhas Aéreas Inteligentes

Fleet

Current Fleet

As of January 2021, Amaszonas Uruguay's fleet consisted of the following aircraft:

Former fleet
Amaszonas Uruguay formerly operated the following aircraft:

See  also
List of defunct airlines of Uruguay

References

External links

Official website

Defunct airlines of Uruguay
Airlines disestablished in 2021
Airlines established in 2015
2015 establishments in Uruguay
2021 disestablishments in Uruguay